Victoriano Ríos Pérez (19 June 1930 – 9 January 2018) was a Spanish physician and politician.

Born on 19 June 1930 in San Cristóbal de La Laguna, he attended the University of La Laguna, where he later taught. Ríos contested the 1986 Canary Islands parliamentary elections, and served until 1999. From 1987 to 1995, Ríos was president of the regional legislature, which nominated Ríos to the Senate later that year. Upon stepping down in 2003, Ríos returned to the Parliament of the Canary Islands until 2004. He died in Tenerife on 9 January 2018, aged 87.

References

1930 births
2018 deaths
Canarian Coalition politicians
Members of the 2nd Parliament of the Canary Islands
Members of the 3rd Parliament of the Canary Islands
Members of the 4th Parliament of the Canary Islands
Members of the 6th Parliament of the Canary Islands
Members of the Senate of Spain
People from San Cristóbal de La Laguna
Presidents of the Parliament of the Canary Islands
20th-century Spanish physicians
21st-century Spanish physicians
University of La Laguna alumni
Academic staff of the University of La Laguna